Great Valley may refer to:

Places
Central Valley (California), or Great Valley, or Great Central Valley, that runs through the center of California.
The Great Appalachian Valley extending from Canada to Alabama
Great Valley, New York, a town in Cattaraugus County, New York, USA

Pennsylvania
Great Valley (Pennsylvania)
Great Valley School District
Great Valley Corporate Center

See also
Great Rift Valley, Kenya, a major rift valley
Great Rift Valley (geographical concept), a series of connected rifts in SW Asia and East Africa
Great Valley Sequence, a group of geologic formations in the Central Valley of California
A fictional fertile place of refuge for dinosaurs in the film The Land Before Time
Great Valley Products, a computer hardware supplier